Unsterblich (Immortal) is the eighth studio album by the German punk band Die Toten Hosen. The band has stated dissatisfaction with the cover, which is a photo by Johann Zambryski. This album is considered overall one of the more peaceful and quiet DTH albums, although there are some loud songs on the album.

Track listing
 "Entschuldigung, es tut uns leid!" (Forgive us, we're sorry!) (Frege/Jacques Palminger, Frege, Joe Tirol) − 4:05
 "Lesbische, schwarze Behinderte" (Lesbian, black, disabled people) (van Dannen/van Dannen) − 2:28 (Funny van Dannen cover)
 "Warum werde ich nicht satt?" (roughly Why don't I get enough?) (Breitkopf, von Holst/Frege) − 3:28
 "Wofür man lebt" (Why one lives) (von Holst, Meurer/Frege) − 3:18
 "Helden und Diebe" (Heroes and thieves) (Breitkopf/Frege) − 6:05
 "Sonntag im Zoo" (Sunday at the zoo) (Frank Ziegert) − 2:37 (Frank Z. cover)
 "Schön sein" (To be beautiful) (Frege, van Dannen/Frege, van Dannen) − 3:12
 "Container-Lied" (Container song) (Meurer/Frege) − 1:07
 "Alles wie immer" (Everything as always) (Meurer/Frege) − 2:49
 "Unsterblich" (Immortal) (Frege, von Holst/Frege) − 3:46
 "Inter-Sex" (Meurer) − 0:40
 "Call of the Wild" (Breitkopf/Frege, T. V. Smith) − 3:23
 "Unser Haus" (Our house) (von Holst/Frege) − 3:22
 "Regen" (Rain) (Rohde/Frege) − 2:09
 "König der Blinden" (King of the blind) (Breitkopf, von Holst/Frege) − 3:32
 "Bayern" (lit. Bavaria, used as a reference for the German football club FC Bayern Munich) (van Dannen, Frege/van Dannen, Frege) − 4:16
 "Der Mond, der Kühlschrank und ich" (The moon, the refrigerator and I) (van Dannen, Frege/van Dannen, Frege) − 2:43
 "Die Unendlichkeit" (The endlessness) (von Holst/Frege) − 1:28

2007 remastered anniversary edition bonus tracks
<li> "Ich seh' die Schiffe den Fluß herunterfahren" (I see the ships floating downstream) (Ziegert, Strauss/Hansen) – 2:41 (from the compilation Pop 2000; Abwärts cover)
<li> "Fußball" (Football) (von Holst/Frege) – 2:09 (from "Schön sein")
<li> "Im Westen nichts Neues" (All quiet on the Western front) (Breitkopf/Frege) – 1:59 (from "Schön sein")
<li> "Gesicht 2000" (Face 2000) (Breitkopf/Frege) – 2:20 (Unsterblich demo)
<li> "Lass doch mal Dampf ab" (Let some steam off for once) (/Fred Weyrich) – 2:24 (from "Bayern"; Gert Fröbe cover)
<li> "Meine Stadt" (My city) (Breitkopf/Frege) – 2:47 (from the compilation Pro Asyl - On the Run)
<li> "Neandertaler" (Neanderthal) (van Dannen, Frege/van Dannen, Frege) – 3:22 (Unsterblich demo)
<li> "In der Nacht der lebenden Leichen" (In the night of the living corpses) (Meurer/Frege) – 2:33 (from the compilation Fritz 10 Jahre)
 "You're Dead" (von Holst/Frege, Smith) – 4:41 (from "Schön sein"/You Are Dead OST)

Singles
1999: "Schön sein"
2000: "Unsterblich"
2000: "Bayern"
2000: "Warum werde ich nicht satt?"

Demos
Two unreleased demos from the album surfaced in 2007 with the re-release of main DTH albums.

"Zigarettenautomat" (Cigarette machine) (Frege, Hanns Christian Müller/Müller, Frege) – 2:04 (released on Ein kleines bisschen Horrorschau)
"Steht auf, zum Gebet!" (Stand up, for prayer[s]) (Frege/Frege) – 1:58 (released on Auf dem Kreuzzug ins Glück)

Personnel
Campino - vocals
Andreas von Holst - guitar
Michael Breitkopf - guitar
Andreas Meurer - bass
Wolfgang Rohde - drums (4, 11, 14, 16)
Vom Ritchie - drums
Big Noise Orchestra (Hans Steingen) - brass instruments
Birte Schuler - cello

Charts

Weekly charts

Year-end charts

References 

Die Toten Hosen albums
1999 albums
German-language albums